Gunton Warren and Corton Woods is a 31.9 hectare Local Nature Reserve in Lowestoft in Suffolk. The site is owned by Waveney District Council, and  Gunton Warren is managed by the Suffolk Wildlife Trust while Corton Woods are managed by local volunteers of the Corton Woods Project.

Gunton Warren is a coastal site which has sand dunes, shingle, lowland heath and cliff slopes. Birds include rare migrants including icterines and yellow-browed warblers. Corton Woods has mature trees and diverse flora such as lesser celandine, bee orchids and common spotted orchids.

There is access to both sites from Corton Road.

References

Suffolk Wildlife Trust
Local Nature Reserves in Suffolk
Suffolk coast
Lowestoft